The Toronto Rock are a lacrosse team based in Toronto, Ontario playing in the National Lacrosse League (NLL). The 2007 season was the franchise's 11th season, and its 10th season as the Toronto Rock.

After firing head coach and GM Terry Sanderson following the 2006 season, the Rock hired Glenn Clark, who played for eight seasons with the franchise, as their new head coach. Clark led the Rock to their worst record ever, and first season under .500. However, both the Philadelphia Wings and Chicago Shamrox finishing with the same 6–10 record, and the Rock sneaked into the playoffs by virtue of tiebreakers. The celebration was short-lived, however, as the Rock scored only 6 goals losing their playoff game against the eventual champion Rochester Knighthawks.

2007 marked the first Rock season without All-Star forward Colin Doyle, who was traded with Darren Halls to San Jose in the off-season for former first-overall draft pick Ryan Benesch, Kevin Fines, and Chad Thompson. Benesch was named Rookie of the Year.

Regular season

Conference standings

Game log
Reference:

Playoffs

Game log
Reference:

Player stats
Reference:

Runners (Top 10)

Note: GP = Games played; G = Goals; A = Assists; Pts = Points; LB = Loose balls; PIM = Penalty minutes

Goaltenders
Note: GP = Games played; MIN = Minutes; W = Wins; L = Losses; GA = Goals against; Sv% = Save percentage; GAA = Goals against average

Awards

Transactions

Trades

Roster
Reference:

See also
2007 NLL season

References

External links

Toronto
2007 in Toronto
2007 in Canadian sports